The Philippine ten-peso coin (₱10) is the second largest denomination coin of the Philippine peso.

Two versions of this denomination are in circulation; the bi-metallic coin, first issued in 2000, with the dual profiles of Andrés Bonifacio and Apolinario Mabini on obverse and the 1993 logo of the Bangko Sentral ng Pilipinas on the reverse. The current version, issued since 2018, features a portrait of Apolinario Mabini on the obverse side and the Kapa-kapa and the current logo of the Bangko Sentral ng Pilipinas on the reverse side.

Firstly, the ten peso coin was produced in conjunction along with the ten peso note, which commenced from the year 2000 to 2001. However, production for the ten peso note became obsolete when the Bangko Sentral ng Pilipinas (BSP) stopped printing the banknotes in 2001.

Design
The coins are composed of nickel-plated steel. The diameter of the coins are 27 mm, and a mass of 8.0 grams. The coins' edges are reeded with edge lettering. The obverse side of the coin features a portrait of only Apolinario Mabini, unlike before in the BSP Coin series which also featured a profile of Andres Bonifacio alongside Mabini.

History

Independence

BSP Coin Series 
On July 10, 2001, BSP issued the 10-piso coin for general circulation to commemorate its 8th anniversary. It has the profiles of Andrés Bonifacio and Apolinario Mabini in a con-joint or in tandem manner on the obverse side. The reverse side bears the seal of the Bangko Sentral ng Pilipinas which is consistent with the common reverse design of the other six denominations. This has been an additional denomination to the current coin circulation and a replacement for the 10-piso New Design/BSP Series banknote.

New Generation Currency Coin Series 
Issued in 2018, the ten piso coin features a portrait of Apolinario Mabini, the denomination and year of issue on the obverse. The reverse side features the Kapa-kapa (Medinilla magnifica) flower and the current logo of the Bangko Sentral ng Pilipinas.

Version history

Commemorative coins
The Bangko Sentral ng Pilipinas (BSP) issued a commemorative ten peso coin in 1988 to commemorate the 1986 People Power Revolution.

BSP also released a commemorative ten peso coin on December 18, 2013, to commemorate the 150th Birth Anniversary of the leader of Katipunan, Andres Bonifacio.

On December 19, 2014, The Bangko Sentral ng Pilipinas (BSP) published an announcement that three new limited edition, commemorative circulation coins, including Apolinario Mabini 150th anniversary commemorative 10 peso coin, which was released on Monday, 22 December 2014. Another commemorative coin was released on December 22, 2015, commemorating the 150th birth anniversary of Miguel Malvar (First Philippine president-unofficial).

References

Currencies of the Philippines
Coins of the Philippines
Ten-base-unit coins